Live Nation Entertainment is an American global entertainment company that was founded in 2010 following the merger of Live Nation and Ticketmaster. The company promotes, operates, and manages ticket sales for live entertainment in the United States and internationally. It also owns and operates entertainment venues, and manages the careers of music artists.

The company has faced widespread criticism over its central role in the consolidation of the live events industry, allegations that it proactively engages in anti-competitive practices, poor handling of the ticket sale process for highly popular events, and injuries and deaths that have occurred at many of its events.

History 
In 2009, Live Nation and Ticketmaster, a concert promotion firm and ticketing company, reached an agreement to merge. The new company received regulatory approval and was named Live Nation Entertainment. Michael Rapino, then-CEO of Live Nation, became the new company's CEO, while Ticketmaster CEO Irving Azoff was named executive chairman.

The merger was approved first in Norway and Turkey in 2009. The United Kingdom's Competition Commission provisionally ruled against the merger, but reversed its decision on December 22, 2009.

The merger was opposed in the U.S. by some regulators, artists, fans, and competing firms, who argued it would reduce competition in the industry and increase ticket costs. Artist Bruce Springsteen was one vocal opponent of the merger at the time.

On January 25, 2010, the United States Justice Department approved the merger pending certain conditions. Ticketmaster had to sell ownership of its self-ticketing company, Paciolan, and license its software to Anschutz Entertainment Group (AEG), which would allow it to compete "head-to-head" with Ticketmaster for business. AEG was given the option after five years to buy the software, replace it with something else, or partner with another ticketing company. Additionally, Live Nation Entertainment was placed under a 10-year court order prohibiting it from retaliating against venues that choose to accept competing ticket contracts.

Investments and growth 
In 2012, the company announced a partnership with Creativeman Productions, based in Tokyo, Japan.

In 2013, the company acquired the Voodoo Music + Arts Experience and announced a joint venture with Insomniac Events, a promoter focused on electronic dance music. The company later acquired C3 Presents (2014), Bonnaroo Music and Arts Festival (2015), and Founders Entertainment (2016), the parent company of the Governors Ball Music Festival.

In August 2015, Live Nation announced it would form Live Nation Germany, in partnership with German promoter Marek Lieberberg. Live Nation Germany would also have oversight over Live Nation events in Austria and Switzerland. In February 2016, Live Nation acquired Canada's largest independent concert promoter, Union Events.  The following month in March 2016, Live Nation acquired Big Concerts International, South Africa's leading concert promoter.

In October 2016, Live Nation Entertainment bought Knoxville-based AC Entertainment. The company continued to invest in music festivals and promoters in 2017, purchasing a controlling interest in BottleRock Napa Valley Music Festival, Salt Lake City-based concert promoter United Concerts, and CT Touring, as well as Israeli promoter Blue Stone Entertainment and the UK's Cuffe & Taylor. In 2017, Live Nation Entertainment reported revenue of $10.3 billion.

In 2018, the company acquired majority stakes in Frank Productions, Emporium Presents, and Red Mountain Entertainment. In May 2018, Live Nation Entertainment also acquired a majority stake in Brazil's Rock in Rio festival (including from previous stakeholder SFX Entertainment, which was involved in a failed attempt at a U.S. version of the event in Las Vegas), with its founder Roberto Medina continuing to manage the festival's operations, and providing consulting to Live Nation.

In April 2018, the United States Department of Justice launched an investigation following allegations by AEG that Live Nation pressured them into using Ticketmaster and intentionally avoided booking acts for AEG venues. Live Nation stated that decisions in selecting venues were not punitive, and were instead based on size and management.

In October 2019, Live Nation acquired a majority stake in David Grutman's Groot Hospitality, which includes several nightclubs and restaurants in the Miami area (including the Fontainebleau Miami Beach hotel's LIV nightclub).

In 2020, Live Nation was hit particularly hard by the COVID-19 pandemic, with essentially all concerts and sporting events around the world on hold. The company has been sued as it has been reluctant to offer full refunds to customers, though it has since amended its refund rules to address those complaints. On February 25, 2021, Live Nation released its full-year 2020 financial results, of which the company saw revenues fall by 84%.

In April 2020, it was disclosed that the Saudi Arabian Public Investment Fund (PIF) had recently acquired a 5.7% stake in Live Nation, as of April 28, 2020, the investment was  valued at just shy of $500 million. The transaction, performed on the open market, made the PIF Live Nation's third-largest shareholder.

In 2021, Live Nation acquired a majority stake in streaming entertainment company Veeps.  On April 25, 2022, Live Nation acquired the Filipino promoter Music Management International (MMI) to create its local branch.

Operating divisions 
Live Nation Entertainment's business segments are concerts, ticketing, and sponsorship and advertising. The company promotes and operates live music events and manages artists under its concerts division Live Nation Concerts. Live Nation Entertainment's artist management arm, called Artist Nation, is included within its concerts division and also includes Front Line Management and Roc Nation. Live Nation Entertainment owns and operates venues, including the House of Blues. The company sells tickets to live events through Ticketmaster.

Legal issues 
The company has faced various lawsuits alleging ticket price fixing, hidden fees and anti-competitive practices. Live Nation has been linked to at least 200 deaths and 750 injuries at its events in seven countries since 2006. From 2016 to 2019, they had also been cited for at least ten OSHA violations, fined for several more serious incidents, and sued civilly at least once for a concert incident.

Destiny's Child manager Mathew Knowles unsuccessfully sued Live Nation in 2011, asserting that the company had spread false information about his business dealings with Beyoncé.

In June 2013, Live Nation was charged with violating Ontario health and safety laws following a stage collapse at a Radiohead concert that killed one crew member. A 2019 inquest returned a verdict of accidental death.

In November 2021, a crowd crushing incident occurred at Astroworld Festival—a Live Nation-promoted concert in Houston organized and headlined by rapper Travis Scott—which resulted in 10 fatalities and nearly 5,000 injuries. Live Nation, Scott, and other parties involved have been named in over 387 lawsuits related to the incident, which in January 2022 were combined down into a single case. In December 2021, the United States Congress House Oversight Committee announced a bipartisan investigation into Live Nation's role in the incident.

In February 2022, the family of Drakeo the Ruler filed a wrongful death lawsuit against Live Nation in the Los Angeles County Superior Court, after the rapper was killed in a homicide that occurred backstage at the Once Upon a Time in LA music festival at BMO Stadium. The suit claimed that Live Nation had negligently failed to employ proper and effective security measures at the event. Live Nation sought a motion to dismiss the suit, arguing that the incident was rare and "unforeseen". However in January 2023, judge Yolanda Orozc rejected the motion and allowed the suit to continue, ruling that "the fact that defendants knew security would be needed for the event, supports the finding that the performing artists’ safety was a concern for defendants and foreseeable to defendants."

In May 2022, Representative for New Jersey's 9th congressional district Bill Pascrell stated that he had issued letters to the Federal Trade Commission and U.S. Department of Justice calling for Live Nation to be unwound and broken up, citing its safety record and other factors. These calls were repeated in November 2022 after the Taylor Swift (The Eras Tour) Ticketmaster controversy.

References

External links 
 

 
Ticket sales companies
Online retailers of the United States
Electronic music event management companies
Festival organizations
Sports management companies
Music festival organizations
Entertainment companies based in California
Entertainment companies established in 2010
2010 establishments in California
American companies established in 2010
Companies based in Beverly Hills, California
Companies listed on the New York Stock Exchange
Corporate spin-offs
Music promoters